The International Society for NeuroVirology (ISNV) was founded to promote research into disease-causing viruses that infect the human brain and nervous system. The ISNV membership includes scientists and clinicians from around the world who work in the fields of basic, translational, and clinical neurovirology.

History 

The ISNV was conceived during the 1st International Symposium on NeuroVirology, which was held in Philadelphia, Pennsylvania, USA, in 1997. The ISNV was officially established in 1998 as a non-profit organization by Kamel Khalili, Ph.D, with Brian Wigdahl, Ph.D., and Steven Jacobson, Ph.D., as its founding president and vice-president, respectively. The leadership of the Society has included:

Mission 

The ISNV provides an international forum for researchers and clinical scientists working in the field of neurovirology. By promoting collaborative interactions among scientists with common interests, the ISNV supports advances in the field of neurovirology and related disciplines. The goal of the ISNV is to promote basic science as well as the clinical application of knowledge to the prevention and treatment of neuroinflammatory and viral diseases of the nervous system. The mission of the ISNV is accomplished primarily through the organization and sponsorship of regular international meetings, and through the Society's official publication, the Journal of NeuroVirology. Activities that support the mission of the ISNV include:
 Organization and sponsorship of the International Symposium on NeuroVirology
 Co-sponsorship of small research conferences in neurovirology and related areas
 Publication of reviews and research articles in the bi-monthly Journal of NeuroVirology
 Publication and electronic distribution of the Society newsletter, which features current topics in neurovirology and highlights significant scientific achievements of neurovirologists from around the world
 Sponsorship of the Pioneer in NeuroVirology award, which recognizes researchers who make important contributions to the field of neurovirology
 Support of education in neurovirology-related areas by sponsorship of graduate and post-graduate participation in the International Symposium on NeuroVirology

Membership 

The ISNV currently has approximately 330 members, who collectively represent 15 countries around the world. Approximately one-quarter of its members reside outside the United States. Annual memberships are available to faculty members, research scientists, and clinicians who have interests in neurovirology. Post-doctoral fellows and students are also eligible to join (at a reduced membership rate).

Governance 

The ISNV is managed through its board of directors, which meets bi-annually and in conjunction with the International Symposium on NeuroVirology. The board of directors is responsible for choosing the society's executive officers, which include a president, vice-president, secretary, and treasurer. The president serves as the chief executive officer of the organization.

The current president of the ISNV is Avindra Nath, who took office in 2013. Nath holds the position of intramural clinical director of the National Institute of Neurological Disorders and Stroke (NINDS) at the National Institutes of Health (NIH).

The following committees, which are composed of ISNV members from around the world, carry out specific functions of the ISNV:
 Fundraising
 Publications and Communications
 Women in NeuroVirology
 Investigators in Training
 Meetings
 International Interests
 Junior Scientists

Symposia 

The ISNV regularly sponsors an International Symposium on NeuroVirology and concurrent Conference on HIV in the Nervous System. These meetings involve more than 350 basic and clinical scientists and trainees working in the areas of neurology, neuropathology, neuropathogenesis, neurobiology, neuroimmunology, neurochemistry, and molecular virology. Symposia have been held at locations around the world since 1997:

The overall goal of these meetings is to provide investigators working in the field of neurovirology and related areas with leading edge information so that important gaps in knowledge can continue to be identified. Armed with this information, attendees of both events work toward formulating questions and experimental directions that will enhance the development of new preventative and therapeutic strategies effective against neurologic diseases associated with prions, HIV, and other viral and non-viral pathogens.

Publications 

The ISNV periodically publishes a newsletter, which is distributed electronically to all members. The goal of the newsletter is to provide a forum through which information about current Society issues as well as "hot" news in the field of neurovirology can be disseminated.

The official journal of the ISNV is the Journal of NeuroVirology. The Journal of NeuroVirology (JNV) provides a unique platform for the publication of high-quality basic science and clinical studies on the molecular biology and pathogenesis of viral infections of the nervous system, and for reporting on the development of novel therapeutic strategies using neurotropic viral vectors. The journal also emphasizes publication of papers on non-viral infections that affect the central nervous system. The journal publishes original research articles, reviews, case reports, and coverage of various scientific meetings, as well as supplements and special issues on selected subjects. The journal has been published by Springer since 2011.

Pioneer in NeuroVirology 

The Pioneer in NeuroVirology award is presented by the ISNV in recognition of outstanding individual achievement in the field of neurovirology. Each International Symposium on NeuroVirology honors a worthy recipient of this award. Pioneers in NeuroVirology have been recognized by the ISNV since 1999. Recipients of the Pioneer in NeuroVirology Award include:
 Richard T. Johnson, M.D. (1999)
 Volker ter Meulen, M.D., Ph.D. (2000)
 Neal Nathanson, M.D. (2002)
 Michael B. A. Oldstone, M.D. (2003)
 Hilary Koprowski, M.D. (2004)
 Opendra Narayan, D.V.M., Ph.D. (2006)
 Donald H. Gilden, M.D. (2007)
 Diane Griffin, M.D., Ph.D. (2009)
 Kamel Khalili, Ph.D. (2010)
 Avindra Nath, M.D. (2012)
 Brian Wigdahl, Ph.D. (2013)
 Joseph Berger, M.D. (2015)

External links 
International Society for NeuroVirology home page
Journal of NeuroVirology home page

References 

Viral infections of the central nervous system
Virology organizations
Neuroscience organizations
Scientific organizations established in 1998